PT Hero Supermarket Tbk, commonly known as Hero, is a large retailer in Indonesia. It is a subsidiary of DFI Retail Group.

Hero first opened in 1971, and now operates more than 700 locations in Indonesia, under six different brands. Hero operates hypermarkets and supermarkets under the Hero name, as well as Giant Ekspres and Ekstra. Hero also operates Guardian Healthy & Beauty Stores as well as IKEA stores, and operated convenience stores under the Starmart name until 2016.

In 2021, Hero would retire the Giant brand from 31 July 2021. Some of the currently operated stores will be converted into Hero while 5 large-size Giant stores will be converted into IKEA stores; as what had been done in 2019 when IKEA replaced a standalone Giant hypermarket in Sentul, Bogor, West Java.

Slogan 
 Rumah Belanja Keluarga (Family Shopping House, 1987–1992)
 Memberi lebih dari yang Anda bayarkan (Give more than you pay for, 1992–1997)
 Kejutan Segar Setiap Hari (Fresh Surprise Every Day, 1997–2000)
 Think Fresh. Shop Hero (2000–2005)
 always my hero! (2005–2009)
 The fresh food people (2009–present)

References

1971 establishments in Indonesia
1980s initial public offerings
Indonesian companies established in 1971
Supermarkets of Indonesia
Companies based in Tangerang
Companies listed on the Indonesia Stock Exchange
Department stores of Indonesia
DFI Retail Group
Retail companies established in 1971